The Lessard River is a tributary of the rivière Franquelin Branche Ouest, flowing in the unorganized territory of Rivière-aux-Outardes, in the Manicouagan Regional County Municipality, in the administrative region of Côte-Nord, in the province of Quebec, in Canada.

Forestry is the main economic activity in this valley; recreational tourism activities, second.

The surface of the Lessard River is usually frozen from the beginning of November to the end of April, except the rapids areas; however, safe circulation on the ice is generally from late November to early April.

Geography 
The Lessard River draws its source from a small lake located in the unorganized territory of Rivière-aux-Outardes. This mouth is located at:
  north-west of the village center of Franquelin;
  south-west of the mouth of the Franquelin river West branch.

  north across Lake Castonguay, to its mouth;
  towards the north by crossing on  Lac Bezeau, until its mouth;
  towards the east by forming a loop towards the north, until the outlet (coming from the south) of Lake Lessard;
  eastward in a relatively straight line, collecting a stream (coming from the northwest), to its mouth.

The Lessard river flows on the southwest bank of the rivière Franquelin Branche Ouest. This confluence is located southeast of Lac à l'Oignon, either:

  west of the mouth of the rivière Franquelin Branche Ouest;
  north of the mouth of the Franquelin River;
  west of the village center of Godbout;
  north-east of downtown Baie-Comeau.

From the mouth of the Lessard river, the current descends on  the course of the rivière Franquelin Branche Ouest, then on  the course of the Franquelin river to the north shore of the estuary of Saint Lawrence.

Toponymy 
The term "Lessard" is a family name of French origin.

The toponym "Lessard River" was formalized on December 5, 1968, at the Place Names Bank of the Commission de toponymie du Québec.

See also 
 Gulf of St. Lawrence
 List of rivers of Quebec

References 

Rivers of Côte-Nord
Manicouagan Regional County Municipality